Vestgötabreen is a glacier in Oscar II Land at Spitsbergen, Svalbard. It has a length of about seven kilometers, and is located between Løvliefjellet and the mountain ranges of Holmesletfjella and Motalafjella. The glacier is named from the Swedish province of Västergötland.

References

Glaciers of Spitsbergen